Kalatu or Kelatu, also rendered as Kalato, may refer to:
 Kalatu, Darab, Fars Province
 Kalatu, Kazerun, Fars Province
 Kalatu, Bandar Abbas, Hormozgan Province
 Kalatu, Bandar Lengeh, Hormozgan Province
 Kalatu, Hajjiabad, Hormozgan Province
 Kalatu, Rudan, Hormozgan Province
 Kalatu, Kerman